Ruwiel is a former municipality in the Dutch province of Utrecht. It existed from 1818 to 1964, when it was merged with Breukelen.

References

Former municipalities of Utrecht (province)
Stichtse Vecht